Matthew or Matt King may refer to:

Matthew
 Matthew King (composer) (born 1967), British composer and pianist
 Matthew King (cricketer) (born 1977), Australian cricketer
 Matthew Yang King (born 1974), American actor, voice actor, director, producer, and writer
 Matthew King (Emmerdale), a fictional character in British TV soap opera Emmerdale
 Matthew King ( – 1737), real name of highwayman Tom King
 Matthew Leander King (1878–1919), American engineer
 Matthew Peter King (c.1773–1823), English composer
 Matthew King (MP), English MP for Malmesbury

Matt
 Matt King (American football) (born 1983), American football player
 Matt King (artist) (1985–2022), American artist and co-founder of Meow Wolf
 Matt King (Canadian musician), member of Canadian indie band DD/MM/YYYY
 Matt King (comedian) (born 1968), British actor and comedian
 Matt King (cricketer) (born 1994), English cricketer
 Matt King (politician) (born 1967), Former New Zealand member of parliament
 Matt King (rugby league) (born 1980), Australian rugby league footballer
 Matt King (singer) (born 1966), American country music artist
 Matt King (vlogger) (born 1996), American vlogger, part of The Vlog Squad